Mychel Thompson (born June 1, 1988) is an American former professional basketball player. He played college basketball at Pepperdine University.

Early life
Thompson was born on June 1, 1988, in Los Angeles, California to Mychal and Julie Thompson. His father, Mychal Thompson, was the first overall pick in the 1978 NBA draft and spent his 14-year career playing for the Portland Trail Blazers, Los Angeles Lakers and San Antonio Spurs in the NBA and Juvecaserta Basket in Italy. 

Thompson has a younger brother, Klay, who played college basketball at Washington State University before being drafted in the first round of the 2011 NBA draft by the Golden State Warriors. His youngest brother, Trayce, was drafted in the 2nd round of the 2009 MLB Draft by the Chicago White Sox. All three were raised Catholic.

Mychel played high school basketball at Jesuit High School in Portland, Oregon for two years, before finishing off his high school career at Santa Margarita Catholic High School in Rancho Santa Margarita, California. After high school, he played one year at Stoneridge Prep, located in Simi Valley, California. He averaged 4.9 points and 3.1 rebounds per game that season.

College career
Heading into college, Thompson was rated as a two-star recruit by Rivals.com and the 91st-best fifth year player by Hoop Scoop Online. On November 9, 2006, he committed to playing for Pepperdine University. In his freshman season at Pepperdine, he started 24 of 32 games and averaged 8.1 points and 2.7 rebounds per game. He led the team in three pointers made with 56 and in three-point field goal percentage with 37.3% of his attempts going in. Thompson made a three-pointer in 30 of the 32 games he played. Against Northern Arizona, he scored a season-high 22 points, including five three-pointers.

Thompson started 30 of Pepperdine's 32 games in his sophomore season, averaging 9.6 points and 3.5 rebounds per game. He made 35 three-pointers that season, which tied him for the team lead. During the season, he made at least one three-pointer in 21 games. In the season opener, he scored a season-high 25 points against Cal State-Monterey Bay.

As a junior, Thompson averaged 11.8 points and 5.0 rebounds per game, en route to being named to the All–West Coast Conference honorable mention team. For the third straight season, he led the team in three-pointers made with 48. He tied his career-high of 25 points against the Utah Utes on December 23, 2009, and was later named the Co–West Coast Conference Player of the Week for his performance against Loyola Marymount, a game in which he scored 22 points and made six of his seven three-point attempts.

In his final season at Pepperdine, he averaged 14.6 points per game and 5.9 rebounds per game, both of which led the team. Thompson also led the team in three-pointers made for the fourth consecutive season with 53. For the second straight season, he was named to the All–WCC honorable mention team. Against the Nevada Wolf Pack, he scored a career-high 34 points. On February 2, 2011, he scored 31 points and grabbed 10 rebounds against the San Francisco Dons, becoming the first player from Pepperdine to record over 30 points and grab over 10 rebounds since 2005. Thompson finished his career at Pepperdine with 1,413 points, which is 14th best in school history. He also played in a school record 128 games and his 192 three-pointers made in his career was good enough for fourth highest in school history.

Professional career

Erie BayHawks (2011)
Thompson went undrafted in the 2011 NBA draft. On November 3, 2011, he was selected by the Erie BayHawks in the third round of the 2011 NBA Development League Draft.

Cleveland Cavaliers (2011–2012) 
On December 9, 2011, Thompson signed with the Cleveland Cavaliers. On February 6, 2012, he was waived by the Cavaliers after just five games.

Return to Erie (2012) 
On February 10, 2012, Thompson was re-acquired by the BayHawks.

In July 2012, Thompson joined the New York Knicks for the 2012 NBA Summer League. On September 11, 2012, he signed with the Knicks. However, he was later waived by the Knicks on October 27, 2012. On November 1, 2012, he was re-acquired by the Erie BayHawks.

Sioux Falls Skyforce (2013) 
On January 3, 2013, Thompson was traded to the Sioux Falls Skyforce in a three-way trade involving the Rio Grande Valley Vipers and the Erie BayHawks.

Santa Cruz Warriors (2013–2015) 
In July 2013, Thompson joined the Minnesota Timberwolves for the 2013 NBA Summer League. On November 4, 2013, the Sioux Falls Skyforce traded Thompson's rights to the Santa Cruz Warriors. On November 19, 2013, he was acquired by the Warriors.

Santa Cruz is the  D-League affiliate of the NBA Golden State Warriors.
During this season at Santa Cruz, Thompson played in the back court with Seth Curry. At the same time, their respective brothers Klay and Steph were playing together in the Golden State back court, Correspondingly, Mychel and Seth were dubbed the Splash Brothers of the D-League. 

On November 3, 2014, Thompson was reacquired by the Santa Cruz Warriors. On April 26, 2015, he won the D-League championship with the Warriors.

Pallacanestro Varese (2015)
On July 16, 2015, Thompson signed with Pallacanestro Varese of Italy. On December 22, he parted ways with Varese after appearing in nine league games and five FIBA Europe Cup games.

Return to Santa Cruz (2016–2017) 
On February 27, 2016, Thompson was reacquired by Santa Cruz. That night, he made his season debut in a 133–124 loss to the Reno Bighorns, recording 16 points, one rebound and one assist in 23 minutes.

On November 11, 2016, Thompson was reacquired by the Santa Cruz Warriors.
Thompson retired from professional basketball in 2018.

International career
Thompson played for the Bahamas men's national basketball team during the 2022 FIBA AmeriCup qualification.

NBA career statistics

Regular season

|-
| style="text-align:left;"| 
| style="text-align:left;"| Cleveland
| 5 || 3 || 19.0 || .292 || .364 || .000 || 1.0 || 1.4 || .4 || .2 || 3.6
|- class="sortbottom"
| style="text-align:center;" colspan="2"| Career
| 5 || 3 || 19.0 || .292 || .364 || .000 || 1.0 || 1.4 || .4 || .2 || 3.6

References

External links
NBA D-League profile
Pepperdine Waves bio

1988 births
Living people
African-American Catholics
American expatriate basketball people in Italy
American men's basketball players
American people of Bahamian descent
Bahamian men's basketball players
Basketball players from Los Angeles
Big3 players
Cleveland Cavaliers players
Erie BayHawks (2008–2017) players
Pallacanestro Varese players
Pepperdine Waves men's basketball players
Santa Cruz Warriors players
Shooting guards
Sioux Falls Skyforce players
Small forwards
Sportspeople from Lake Oswego, Oregon
Sportspeople from Orange County, California
Undrafted National Basketball Association players
American men's 3x3 basketball players